Clypeoporthe is a genus of fungi in the family Gnomoniaceae. The genus contains four species.

References

External links
Clypeoporthe at Index Fungorum

Gnomoniaceae
Sordariomycetes genera